Fabiana de Almeida Murer (born 16 March 1981) is a retired Brazilian pole vaulter. She holds the South American record in the event with an indoor best of 4.82 m and an outdoor best of 4.87 m, making her the fourth highest vaulter ever at the time, now the eighth. She won the gold medal at the 2011 World Championships in Athletics, at the 2010 IAAF World Indoor Championships and also won at the 2007 Pan American Games. Murer represented Brazil at the 2008, 2012 and 2016 Summer Olympics. She is a four-time South American Champion with wins in 2006, 2007, 2009 and 2011. Murer was coached by both the Ukrainian Vitaly Petrov, who managed the world record holders Sergei Bubka and Yelena Isinbayeva, and her husband, Élson Miranda de Souza, a former vaulter himself.

Career
Murer set an outdoor personal best of 4.80 metres in June 2008 in São Paulo. This was a South American record. She finished tenth at the 2008 Summer Olympics with a vault of 4.50 m, unable to scale the heights that she had in June. During the competition, the organization lost one of Murer's poles, causing her to underperform as she spent over 10 minutes trying to get the pole back.

She improved her outdoor record to 4.82 m in June 2009 at the Troféu Brasil Caixa de Atletismo meet. She made the jump en route to winning her fifth Brazilian championships in the event, breaking the area record for the eleventh time and placing joint sixth in the all-time lists. She competed at the 2009 World Championships in Athletics in Berlin but she failed to match her early season form, finishing with a best clearance of 4.55 m. She improved to 4.60 m at the 2009 IAAF World Athletics Final, winning the silver medal.

At the 2010 IAAF World Indoor Championships, Murer took advantage of Yelena Isinbayeva's failure at 4.75 m and continued at 4.80 m, clearing first time and winning her first global championships. Murer improved her indoor mark to 4.83 m at the Grand Prix in Birmingham, United Kingdom. She further improved her outdoor record in June to 4.85 m at the 2010 Ibero-American Championships in San Fernando, Spain. This mark placed her as the fourth greatest pole vaulter on the all-time lists, and she then attempted 4.93 m, but failed three times.

She was dominant on the 2010 IAAF Diamond League circuit, winning three out of the six diamond race events. Her vault of 4.81 m to win at the Weltklasse Zurich meeting made her the inaugural Diamond League winner of the women's pole vault. She was selected to represent the Americas team at the 2010 IAAF Continental Cup and although she won the bronze medal, her mark of 4.50 m was far from her year's best. She retained her national title at the Troféu Brasil de Atletismo, vaulting 4.70 m to bring a close to her season.

In 2011, Murer became the first Brazilian to win the IAAF World Championship, vaulting 4.85 m at the 2011 World Championships in Athletics in Daegu.

Despite high expectations for the 2012 Summer Olympics, Murer did not qualify for the finals. She failed on the first two attempts for 4.55 m, and gave up on the last complaining about unfavorable wind conditions.

In 2014 Murer won the second Diamond League circuit, winning four out of the seven diamond race events.

Up until 2015 Murer's post-Olympics performances were underwhelming. Then she earned a silver medal at both the 2015 Pan American Games and the 2015 World Championships in Athletics, surpassed only by the Cuban Yarisley Silva. In the latter, Murer reached again her personal best of  4.85 m.

On July 3, 2016, she vaulted 4.87 m at the Troféu Brasil de Atletismo in São Bernardo do Campo, Brazilian athletics trials to Rio 2016, improving her own Brazilian and South American records again. That same month, after attending the Herculis Diamond League meet, Murer felt pain in the neck. Despite treating it, by the time of the London Grand Prix Murer was feeling a lack of strength in her arms. Tests revealed a cervical spinal disc herniation, leading Murer to go through extensive physical therapy to ensure she would perform normally during the 2016 Summer Olympics at home. Still, by the time of the Games Murer fell right in the first attempts at clearing 4.55 m. She later blamed the failure on not being fully recovered from the hernia.

Achievements

Personal bests

All information taken from IAAF Profile.

References

External links

Focus on Athletes article from IAAF
In-depth article from IAAF

Tilastopaja biography

1981 births
Living people
Sportspeople from Campinas
Brazilian female pole vaulters
Brazilian people of German descent
Athletes (track and field) at the 1999 Pan American Games
Athletes (track and field) at the 2007 Pan American Games
Athletes (track and field) at the 2008 Summer Olympics
Athletes (track and field) at the 2011 Pan American Games
Athletes (track and field) at the 2012 Summer Olympics
Athletes (track and field) at the 2016 Summer Olympics
Athletes (track and field) at the 2015 Pan American Games
Olympic athletes of Brazil
World Athletics Championships medalists
World Athletics Championships athletes for Brazil
Pan American Games silver medalists for Brazil
Pan American Games gold medalists for Brazil
Pan American Games medalists in athletics (track and field)
South American Games gold medalists for Brazil
South American Games medalists in athletics
Competitors at the 2014 South American Games
Diamond League winners
World Athletics Indoor Championships winners
World Athletics Championships winners
Medalists at the 2007 Pan American Games
Medalists at the 2011 Pan American Games
Medalists at the 2015 Pan American Games
21st-century Brazilian women